Danielle Kate "Dani" Le Ray (born 6 November 1982) is an Australian gymnast. She started gymnastics in 1989 at the age of six.  She represented Australia as an Olympic competitor at the Sydney Olympics in rhythmic gymnastics in 2000 and in the Commonwealth Games in Kuala Lumpur in 1998.

On the lead up to the Sydney Olympics, Danielle Le Ray also featured in the Bonds "Our Olympic Heroes" calendar alongside Ian Thorpe, Cathy Freeman; Matt Shirvington; Emma George; Geoff Huegill; James Thompkins & Drew Ginn; Grant Hackett; Tania Van Heer; Patrick Johnson; Andrei Kravtsov; Liz Weeks; and Dean Pullar. Pictures were taken by photographer James Houston.

Since retiring as a gymnast Danielle has dedicated her life to creating a nurturing environment for the next generation of gymnasts by founding "Le Ray Gymnastics."

Roles 

 Olympian (2000)
 Founder of Le Ray Gymnastics (2000)
 Australian women's Rhythmic Gymnastics Coach at the 2010 Commonwealth Games.
 The Elite Representative on the NSW RG Gymsport Committee 
 The NSW Independent Girls Schools Sporting Association Gymnastics Convener

Le Ray Gymnastics 
Le Ray Gymnastics is now home of five Gymnastics clubs based in Sydney, Australia:

 Le Ray Gymnastics Abbotsleigh in Wahroonga
 Le Ray Gymnastics Academy & High Performance in Greenacre
 Le Ray Gymnastics Balmain
 Le Ray Gymnastics PLC Sydney in Croydon
 Le Ray Gymnastics Ravenswood in Gordon

Achievements 

 Sydney 2000 Olympian
 Bronze medalist at the Commonwealth Games 1998 in Group All Round
 As the head coach of the Australian women's rhythmic gymnastics team in 2010 the team won the first Australian gold medal in the team event and achieved a further two gold, and two silver in individual events.
 Gymnastics NSW Club of the Year for twelve years running
 Gymnastics NSW Coaching Team of the year for twelve years running
 Founder of "Meriden Rhythmix" (semi-finals of Australia's Got Talent)

References

External links
 
 
 
 
 

1982 births
Living people
Australian rhythmic gymnasts
Olympic gymnasts of Australia
Gymnasts at the 2000 Summer Olympics
Commonwealth Games medallists in gymnastics
Commonwealth Games bronze medallists for Australia
Gymnasts at the 1998 Commonwealth Games
Medallists at the 1998 Commonwealth Games